Michelle Demessine (born 18 June 1947) is a member of the Senate of France, representing the Nord department.  She is a member of the Communist, Republican, and Citizen Group.

References
Page on the Senate website

1947 births
Living people
French Senators of the Fifth Republic
Women members of the Senate (France)
21st-century French women politicians
Senators of Nord (French department)